Trebor Healey is an American poet and novelist.  He was born in San Francisco, raised in Seattle, and studied English and American Literature at the University of California, Berkeley.  He spent his twenties in San Francisco, where he was active in the spoken word scene of the late 1980s and early 1990s, publishing five chapbooks of poetry as well as numerous poems and short stories in various reviews, journals, anthologies and zines.

He is openly gay and is currently living in Los Angeles.

Bibliography

Novels
 Through It Came Bright Colors, 2003 (Haworth Press)
 Faun, 2012 (Lethe Press)
 A Horse Named Sorrow, 2012 (University of Wisconsin Press)

Short Stories
A Perfect Scar and Other Stories, 2007 (Haworth Press)
 Eros & Dust, 2016 (Lethe Press)
 Falling, 2019 (University of Wisconsin Press)

Poetry
 Sweet Son of Pan, 2006 (Suspect Thoughts Press)

Anthologies
 Beyond Definition: New Writing from Gay and Lesbian San Francisco, 1994 (Manic D Press). Co-editor with Marci Blackman.
 Queer and Catholic, 2008 (Taylor & Francis). Co-editor with Amie Evans.

Awards
In 2004, Through It Came Bright Colors won both the Ferro-Grumley Award and the Violet Quill Award, and Gay Today named it one of the ten best novels of 2003. He won a second Ferro-Grumley Award in 2013 for A Horse Named Sorrow.

Healey's short story "The Mercy Seat" was named one of the top 10 stories of 2004 in the storySouth Million Writers Awards.

He was awarded the Jim Duggins Outstanding Mid-Career Novelists' Prize from the Lambda Literary Foundation in 2013.

References

External links
Trebor Healey

21st-century American novelists
American male novelists
American spoken word artists
American gay writers
Writers from California
Living people
University of California, Berkeley alumni
1962 births
American LGBT poets
American LGBT novelists
American male short story writers
21st-century American poets
American male poets
21st-century American short story writers
21st-century American male writers
Gay poets